Agosta was a French Navy  of the M6 ​​series commissioned in 1937. She participated in World War II on the side of the Allies until she was scuttled in 1940.

Characteristics

Agosta was part of a fairly homogeneous series of 31 deep-sea patrol submarines also called "1,500-tonners" because of their displacement. All entered service between 1931 and 1939.

They displaced  on the surface and  underwater. When submerged, their two electric motors produced a combined  and allowed them to reach .

Construction and commissioning

Laid down at Arsenal de Cherbourg in Cherbourg, France, on 2 February 1932 with the hull number Q178, Agosta was launched on either 30 March or 30 April 1934, according to different sources. She was commissioned on 1 February 1937.

Service history

1937–1939
Based on the experiences of other French submarines, which had made similar cruises to places such as Douala in French Cameroon and French Indochina in Southeast Asia, an air refrigeration system was installed aboard Agosta and her sister ship  to test its capability to improve the habitability of French submarines in tropical climates. On 23 December 1937, Agosta arrived at Fort-de-France on Martinique in the French West Indies in company with Bévéziers during their Argentina cruise.

World War II
When World War II began with Germany′s invasion of Poland on 1 September 1939, Agosta was assigned to the 8th Submarine Division in the 4th Submarine Squadron in the High Seas Force′s 1st Squadron based at Brest, France. Her sister ships Bévéziers, Ouessant, and  made up the rest of the division. That day, Agosta, Ouessant, and their sister ships  and  got underway from Brest to investigate the waters around Vigo, Spain, and report on the presence of German ships and submarines there. France declared war on 3 September 1939, and on 4 September the mission was cancelled and the submarines returned to Brest. 

On 14 September 1939, Agosta, Achille, Casabianca, Ouessant, and their sister ships  and  received orders to establish a permanent patrol off Vigo, where German merchant ships — which the Allies suspected of serving as supply ships for German U-boats — had taken refuge upon the outbreak of war. They continued the patrols off Vigo until the end of October 1939.

Agosta and the rest of the 8th Submarine Division next left European waters and proceeded to Fort-de-France on Martinique in the French West Indies to conduct patrols in the vicinity of Trinidad the British had requested. Agosta patrolled primarily in the Columbus Channel, also known as the Serpent's Mouth, between Trinidad and Venezuela. 

On 12 January 1940, Agosta departed Fort-de-France in company with Ouessant bound for Brest. After a stop at Casablanca in French Morocco, the two submarines arrived at Brest on 1 February 1940 and began a major overhaul.

Agosta was still undergoing overhaul when German ground forces advanced into France on 10 May 1940, beginning the Battle of France, and Italy declared war on France on 10 June 1940 and joined the invasion. As German ground forces approached Brest, Agosta, unable to get underway, was scuttled at 19:00 on 18 June 1940 to prevent her capture by the Germans.

The Germans refloated Agosta on 25 June 1941 to clear her berth and towed her to Bordeaux, France. She was salvaged in 1944.

Post-World War II
After her salvage, Agosta was hulked. From 1948 to 1951 she served as a wreck lifter along with Ouessant.

References

Footnotes

Bibliography

 
 
 
 

Redoutable-class submarines (1928)
1934 ships
Ships built in France
World War II submarines of France
Maritime incidents in June 1940
Lost submarines of France
Scuttled vessels
Shipwrecks of France